Psilocybe pseudoaztecorum is a species of mushroom in the family Hymenogastraceae.

It was described from the state of Tamil Nadu in India. This species produces viable amounts of psilocybin in the mycelium phase and is used by mushroom growers for the myceliated grain technique.

See also
List of Psilocybin mushrooms
Psilocybin mushrooms
Psilocybe

References

Entheogens
Psychoactive fungi
pseudoaztecorum
Psychedelic tryptamine carriers
Fungi of North America